A Gentleman's Gentleman is a 1939 British comedy film directed by Roy William Neill and starring Eric Blore, Marie Lohr and Peter Coke. It was made at Teddington Studios and was based on a play by Philip MacDonald.

Cast
 Eric Blore as Heppelwhite
 Marie Lohr as Mrs Handside-Lane
 Peter Coke as Tony
 Patricia Hilliard as Judy
 David Hutcheson as Bassy
 David Burns as Alfred
 Wallace Evennett as Magnus Pomeroy
 C. Denier Warren as Doctor Bottom

References

External links

1939 films
1939 comedy films
British comedy films
Films directed by Roy William Neill
British black-and-white films
1930s English-language films
1930s British films